Solidaridad Obrera (Spanish, meaning "Workers' Solidarity"; originally, in Catalan, Solidaritat Obrera) was a labor federation in Catalonia, Spain. It was initially formed on August 3, 1907, as a "pure syndicalist" federation, incorporating the structures of the Unió Local de Societats Obreres de Barcelona ("Local Union of Workers' Societies of Barcelona") with the purpose of reorganizing the Catalan trade unions. These unions were quite weak at the time, due to the failure of a 1902 general strike which had sought the eight-hour day and the recognition of the right to strike.

There were two constituent meetings of what was initially the Federació Local de Societats Obreres de Barcelona ("Local Federation of Workers' Societies of Barcelona", June 1907), which agreed to publish a common manifesto to constitute an organizing committee, which included Antoni Fabra, Josep Prat, and Tomás Herreros.

The federation established a rule that they would only enroll organizations composed exclusively of workers. They quickly acquired an enormous force among the working class, affiliating many Catalan workers' societies in the congress of September 6–8, 1908, and reconstituting themselves as Catalan Regional Workers' Solidarity. That same year the newspaper Solidaritat Obrera published a manifesto rejecting the proposed Anti-Terrorism Law of the government led by Antonio Maura. Though the federation initially spurned partisanship, and alignment with either the Marxist or anarchist brand of socialism, the congress held on June 13, 1909, brought approval of the general strike, and effective takeover by the anarcho-syndicalists in the federation.

After a major general strike in Barcelona, which ended in the executions of several anarchists, the government repressed elements of the anarchist movement, these events being referred to as the "Tragic Week" (Spanish: la Semana Trágica; Catalan: la Setmana Tràgica). The following repression of workers' movements brought Solidaridad Obrera's activities to a virtual standstill.

The reestablished confederation held its second congress in Barcelona in 31 October–1 November 1910, in which it discussed widening its ambit to all of Spain, a sensitive decision because the rival Unión General de Trabajadores (UGT) already had a sound foundation in the rest of Spain, although not in Catalonia, where it constituted a minority. By a wide margin, they voted to constitute themselves as a workers confederation throughout Spain: the Confederación Nacional del Trabajo (CNT, "National Workers' Confederation").

References

Sources
 
 

History of anarchism
Trade unions established in 1907
Syndicalism
Syndicalist trade unions
Trade unions in Spain
Anarchist organisations in Spain
1907 establishments in Catalonia
Trade unions disestablished in 1910